The 1942 Northwestern Wildcats team represented Northwestern University during the 1942 Big Ten Conference football season. In their eighth year under head coach Pappy Waldorf, the Wildcats compiled a 1–9 record (0–6 against Big Ten Conference opponents) and finished in last place in the Big Ten Conference. Quarterback Otto Graham was selected by both the Associated Press and United Press as a second-team All-Big Ten player. He was also selected as a third-team All-American by The Sporting News and the Central Press.

Schedule

References

Northwestern
Northwestern Wildcats football seasons
Northwestern Wildcats football